Jean-Jacques de Marguerie (12 April 1742, Mondeville – 6 July 1779, Grenada) was a French naval officer and mathematician.

Life
He began his studies at the collège at Caen, discovering Euclid's Elements aged around 18 and soon moving to study mathematics alone. He made such progress in this area that the geometer Alexis Fontaine, whom he met in Paris, offered to become his patron. They edited several papers for the Académie des sciences.

Bibliography
Mémoire sur la résolution des équations en général, et particulièrement sur l’équation du cinquième degré, 1769
Mémoire sur le système du monde, 1770
Mémoire sur une opération d’algèbre appelée l’élimination des inconnues, 1770
Établissement d’une nouvelle théorie de la résistance des fluides, 1770
Dissertation sur le roulis, 1771
Dissertation sur le moyen de trouver les centres de gravité, 1771
Mémoire sur la résolution des équations du cinquième degré, 1771
Mémoire sur la construction, 1772
Mémoire sur la statique des vaisseaux, 1772

1742 births
1779 deaths
French Navy officers
18th-century French mathematicians
18th-century French military personnel